Sir Clifford George Skeggs  (born 19 March 1931) is a New Zealand businessman from Dunedin, and was Mayor of Dunedin from 1977 to 1989.

Early life and family
Skeggs was born in Bluff, and was educated at Bluff School and Southland Technical College. He married Marie Ledgerwood in 1951, and they went on to have three sons.

Business career
He was involved in the fishing industry from 1953, and developed the Skeggs Group of which he was the chairman and chief executive into what was the largest private inshore fishing fleet in New Zealand with investments including shipping, aviation (Pacifica Air) and property.

Political career
Skeggs was on the Dunedin City Council and Otago Harbour Board, and later was chairman of the port company Port Otago. He was mayor of Dunedin from 1977 to 1989.

Honours and awards
In the 1987 Queen's Birthday Honours, Skeggs was appointed a Knight Bachelor, in recognition of his service as the mayor of Dunedin. In 2000, he was inducted into the New Zealand Business Hall of Fame.

References

1931 births
Living people
People from Bluff, New Zealand
Businesspeople from Dunedin
Mayors of Dunedin
New Zealand Knights Bachelor
People educated at Aurora College (Invercargill)
Dunedin City Councillors
Businesspeople awarded knighthoods
New Zealand justices of the peace
New Zealand politicians awarded knighthoods